Diane Vachon (January 23, 1951 – August 24, 1991) was a Canadian professional wrestler and singer, best known by her ring name Vivian Vachon. A member of the Vachon family of wrestlers, she was the sister of Maurice and Paul Vachon, and the aunt of Luna Vachon. She is considered one of the best female wrestlers of the 1970s.

Early life 
Diane Vachon was born on January 23, 1951, in Newport, Vermont, to Ferdinand and Marguerite Vachon, and was part of the Vachon family. The youngest of thirteen children, Vachon was raised on a farm near Montreal, Quebec. She left high school following the 10th grade, and briefly attended Constance Brown's Charm School. She later modelled for a short period and worked in an office.

Professional wrestling career 
At the suggestion of her brother Maurice, she began to train as a professional wrestler, and went to South Carolina to train under The Fabulous Moolah. It was also Maurice who suggested she adopt the ring name Vivian Vachon (sometimes spelled Viviane Vachon).

In 1969, she wrestled for World Wide Wrestling Federation where she teamed with Bette Boucher feuding with The Fabulous Moolah and Toni Rose.  During that same year, she also wrestled in Georgia Championship Wrestling using the ring name Vivian Vance.

In February 1971, she became the California Women's Champion. She became the American Wrestling Association's (AWA) Women's Champion for a time, defeating Kay Noble on November 4, 1971. In the early 1970s she starred in the movie Wrestling Queen, which also included her brothers and other wrestlers. She wrestled in the early 1980s on a tour of Japan, and in 1986 for her brother Maurice's retirement tour. In 2006, she was honored posthumously by the Cauliflower Alley Club. Existing autographs signed by Vachon are thought to be rare.

Personal life 
Vachon was a talented singer and released a few singles in French.

In July 1976, she married wrestler Buddy Wolfe, but the couple separated three years later in 1979. That same year in November, she married Canadian Armed Forces member Gary Carnegie, with whom she had two children, Ian (born 1980) and Julie Lynn (1982-1991). Vachon and Carnegie divorced in 1991.

Death 
Vachon and her nine-year-old daughter Julie died in a car accident on August 24, 1991. They were hit by a drunk driver who had run a stop sign in Mont Saint-Grégoire at the corner of route 104 and Rang de la Montagne.

Championships and accomplishments 
 American Wrestling Association
 AWA World Women's Championship (1 time)
 Cauliflower Alley Club
 Posthumous Award (2006)
 National Wrestling Alliance
 NWA Texas Women's Championship (1 time)
 Professional Wrestling Hall of Fame
 Class of 2015
 Other titles
 California Women's Championship (1 time)
 GPW Women's Championship (1 time)

See also 
 List of premature professional wrestling deaths

References

External links 
 

1951 births
1991 deaths
20th-century professional wrestlers
Accidental deaths in Quebec
AWA World Women's Champions
Canadian female professional wrestlers
Professional wrestlers from Quebec
Professional wrestlers from Vermont
Professional Wrestling Hall of Fame and Museum
Road incident deaths in Canada
Vachon family